Vogabæjarvöllur is a multi-use stadium in Vogar, Iceland. It is currently used mostly for football matches and is the home stadium of Þróttur Vogum. Its capacity is 1,200 (192 seats).

References

Football venues in Iceland